{{DISPLAYTITLE:NAD(P)+ transhydrogenase (Re/Si-specific)}}

In enzymology, a NAD(P)+ transhydrogenase (Re/Si-specific is an enzyme that catalyzes the chemical reaction

NADPH + NAD+  NADP+ + NADH

Thus, the two substrates of this enzyme are NADPH and NAD+, whereas its two products are NADP+ and NADH.

This enzyme belongs to the family of oxidoreductases, specifically those acting on NADH or NADPH with NAD+ or NADP+ as acceptor.  This enzyme participates in nicotinate and nicotinamide metabolism.

Nomenclature 
The systematic name of this enzyme class is NADPH:NAD+ oxidoreductase (Re/Si-specific). Other names in common use include pyridine nucleotide transhydrogenase, transhydrogenase, NAD(P)+ transhydrogenase, nicotinamide adenine dinucleotide (phosphate) transhydrogenase, NAD+ transhydrogenase, NADH transhydrogenase, nicotinamide nucleotide transhydrogenase, NADPH-NAD+ transhydrogenase, pyridine nucleotide transferase, NADPH-NAD+ oxidoreductase, NADH-NADP+-transhydrogenase, NADPH:NAD+ transhydrogenase, H+-Thase, energy-linked transhydrogenase, and NAD(P)+ transhydrogenase (AB-specific).

References

Further reading 

 
 

EC 1.6.1
NADPH-dependent enzymes
NADH-dependent enzymes
Enzymes of known structure